Bel Kamen is a village in Yakoruda Municipality, in Blagoevgrad Province, in southwestern Bulgaria.

References

Villages in Blagoevgrad Province